Graeme Paul Lowdon (born 23 April 1965) is a British businessman and entrepreneur. He served as chief executive officer of the Virgin and Marussia Formula One teams.

Originally from Corbridge, Lowdon grew up in Stocksfield. He gained both a bachelor's and master's degree in mechanical engineering at Sheffield University, as well as an MBA from Newcastle University. Initially he worked in the power industry in the north of England and Singapore, before joining ABB Group working as part of the international sales force for their power station division. He identified that a potential client also ran an IndyCar team in the United States, and assisted in organising a sponsorship deal with the team.

In 1996 Lowdon returned to the UK and created Industry On-line, providing online trading platforms for industry. He also co-founded Eiger Racing, a Formula Renault racing team. Having secured investment from 3i, he developed Industry On-line into Just2Clicks, which was floated on the Alternative Investment Market in 2000. At the end of 2000 Lowdon joined Manor Motorsport in a non-executive commercial role.

In 2002 he co-founded Nomad Digital, now the world's leading provider of data communications to the transportation sector, specialising in providing WiFi on trains.

He helped Manor Motorsport to develop into a Formula One team. Lowdon had strong links with Richard Branson's Virgin Group, Virgin Rail Group being one of Nomad's customers. He used these links to create the Virgin Racing team. He later returned to Manor Motorsport, overseeing its FIA World Endurance Championship programme.

References

Alumni of Newcastle University
Alumni of the University of Sheffield
English businesspeople
Formula One team owners
Living people
1965 births
People from Stocksfield